Pterostylis parva, commonly known as the fawn snail orchid, is a species of orchid endemic to the south-west of Western Australia. As with similar greenhoods, the flowering plants differ from those which are not flowering. The non-flowering plants have a small rosette of leaves flat on the ground but the flowering plants have a single flower with leaves on the flowering spike. In this species, the flower is small, fawn, green and white and is similar to P. timothyi but smaller in stature.

Description
Pterostylis parva is a terrestrial, perennial, deciduous, herb with an underground tuber and when not flowering, a rosette of small bluish green leaves. The dorsal sepal and petals are fused, forming a hood or "galea" over the column and the dorsal sepal has a short point. The labellum is small and not visible from outside the flower. Flowering occurs from June to early August.

Taxonomy and naming
Pterostylis parva was first formally described in 2015 by David Jones and Christopher French from a specimen collected in the Truslove Nature Reserve near Grass Patch and the description was published in Australian Orchid Review. The specific epithet (parva) is a Latin word meaning "little".

Distribution and habitat
The fawn snail orchid grows in shrubland and woodland between Southern Cross and Israelite Bay.

Conservation
Pterostylis parva is listed as "not threatened" by the Government of Western Australia Department of Parks and Wildlife.

References

parva
Endemic orchids of Australia
Orchids of Western Australia
Plants described in 2015